Argidava is a genus of moths in the family Geometridae erected by Francis Walker in 1863.

The List of the Specimens of Lepidopterous Insects in the Collection of the British Museum describes a specimen as follows:

Male. Body rather slender. Proboscis stout. Palpi porrect, pilose, hardly extending beyond the head; third joint extremely short. Antennas moderately pectinated. Abdomen slightly compressed, not extending beyond the hind wings; apical tuft small, elongate. Legs smooth, slender. Wings rather broad; exterior border hardly festooned. Fore wings acute; costa straight; exterior border slightly convex and oblique.

Species
The Index of Scientific Names lists the following names:
Argidava irrorata
Argidava maculata
Argidava punctata Butler 
Argidava sparsularia, a subjective synonym of subviduata Meyrick 1892 
 Argidava subviduata Walker, [1863]

Argidava subviduata

The List of the Specimens of Lepidopterous Insects in the Collection of the British Museum describes a specimen as follows:

Male. Pale slaty cinereous. Head blackish brown in front. Wings very thinly and minutely black-speckled. Fore wings with the interior and submarginal lines composed of black dots; a black dot near the base, and a black elongated discal spot; marginal points black. Hind wings with some trace of the submarginal line of dots. Length of the body 5 lines; of the wings 12 lines.

a. Australia. From Mr. Damel's collection.

References

Nacophorini
Geometridae genera